WANG (1490 AM) is a radio station licensed to Biloxi, Mississippi. Owned by Telesouth Communications, it broadcasts a commercial adult hits format. The station is simulcast on 1640 WTNI, as well as translator station W292GD on 106.3 FM.

History
WLOX announced its grand opening on May 27, 1948 as part of the Mutual Broadcasting System.

In 2018, Alpha Media sold its Biloxi stations, including WANG, to Telesouth Communications. The sale was consummated on March 1, 2019, at a price of $2.5 million.

On March 8, 2019, WANG ended its sports format simulcast with WTNI, and changed its format to classic country, branded as "103.5 The Possum". In June 2019, WTNI ended the remaining sports programming and also flipped to classic country, by resuming its simulcast of WANG.

On December 22, 2020, translator station W278CE moved to 106.3, and WANG and WTNI flipped to a tourist information format as 106.3 Casino Radio. The stations primarily carry segments and advertising highlighting local casinos, restaurants, and other attractions in the Biloxi area.

On October 10, 2021 WANG and WTNI changed their formats from tourist information to adult hits, branded as "Bob 106.3".

Translator

References

External links

ANG
Radio stations established in 1948
Bob FM stations
Adult hits radio stations in the United States